Lone Star Lake may refer to:

 Lone Star Lake in Kansas
 Lone Star Lake (Texas)